Demetris Kyriakou (born 14 October 1986) is a Cypriot footballer who plays for ASIL Lysi as a defensive midfielder.

Career
He is a product of APOEL's youth academies. He was first sent on loan to ENTHOI Lakatamia FC in the 2005–2006 season, but he returned to APOEL for the 2006–07 season, where he became champion for first time in his career. He was sent on loan again to Digenis Akritas Morphou in the 2007–2008 season.  In June 2008 he returned to APOEL and was part of the squad that was crowned Champions. In January 2010, he was sent for third time on loan to Olympiakos Nicosia for six months, but he returned to APOEL for the 2010–11 season and became a champion for third time in his career.

In July 2011, he signed a one-year contract with the Cypriot First Division club Anagennisi Dherynia. On 20 June 2012, Kyriakou signed a contract with AEK Larnaca.

External links
 

1986 births
Living people
Cypriot footballers
Greek Cypriot people
APOEL FC players
Olympiakos Nicosia players
Digenis Akritas Morphou FC players
ENTHOI Lakatamia FC players
Anagennisi Deryneia FC players
AEK Larnaca FC players
Ethnikos Achna FC players
ASIL Lysi players
Sportspeople from Nicosia
Cypriot First Division players
Association football midfielders